The Great Hurricane of 1780 was the deadliest Atlantic hurricane on record. An estimated  22,000 people died throughout the Lesser Antilles when the storm passed through the islands from October 10 to October 16. Specifics on the hurricane's track and strength are unknown, as the official Atlantic hurricane database only goes back to 1851.

Coming in the midst of the American Revolution, the storm caused heavy losses to the British fleet contesting for control of the area, largely weakening British control over the Atlantic. The hurricane later passed near Puerto Rico and over the eastern portion of Hispaniola, causing heavy damage near the coastlines. It ultimately turned to the northeast and was last observed on October 20 southeast of Atlantic Canada.

The death toll from the Great Hurricane alone exceeds that of many entire decades of Atlantic hurricanes. Estimates are marginally higher than for Hurricane Mitch, the second-deadliest Atlantic storm, for which figures are likely more precise. The hurricane was part of the disastrous 1780 Atlantic hurricane season, with two other deadly storms occurring in October.

Meteorological history
This hurricane was first encountered by a boat in the eastern Caribbean Sea, but it may have developed in early October in the eastern Atlantic Ocean off the Cape Verde Islands. The system ultimately strengthened and expanded as it tracked slowly westward; affecting Barbados late on October 9. Late on October 10, the worst of the hurricane passed over the island, with at least one estimate of winds as high as  during landfall, which is higher than any other 1-minute sustained wind speed in recorded Atlantic basin history. The cyclone gradually weakened as it passed to the southwest of Dominica early on October 12 and subsequently struck the island of Guadeloupe.

The hurricane steadily neared Puerto Rico as it paralleled the southern coastline, and on October 14 made its closest point of approach, to the southwest portion of the island. It subsequently turned to the northwest, going through the Mona Passage before making landfall near the present-day Dominican Republic province of Samaná.

On October 19, strong winds and high tides were reported in the British province of East Florida (the northeastern portion of present-day Florida). Christopher W. Landsea and Al Sandrik, NOAA employees, write that it is possible the hurricane passed much closer to the province than previously thought. Another possibility considered was an extension to a hurricane in the western Caribbean Sea. Because of lack of data, the exact track of the Great Hurricane is unknown.

Impact

Estimates of the death toll from the hurricane range from 22,000 to about 28,500, making it the deadliest hurricane in the recorded history of the Atlantic hurricane basin.

British islands

About 4,500 people died on Barbados. The hurricane began affecting the island with rain late on October 9. The ships in the bay broke their moorings by 4:00 the afternoon of October 10, and the full impact arrived around 6:00 in the evening. The hurricane produced violent winds "so deafening that people could not hear their own voices."

The hurricane stripped the bark off trees and left none standing on Barbados. Cuban meteorologist José Carlos Millás has estimated that this damage could be caused only by winds exceeding . Every house and fort on Barbados was destroyed. According to British Admiral George Brydges Rodney, the winds carried their heavy cannons aloft .

The wind directions recorded during the hurricane suggest that the eye missed Barbados to the north. Northwesterly winds increased through the day on October 10. The wind gradually backed to westerly through the night of October 10 and peaked at midnight. Wind speed returned to normal by 8:00 the morning of October 11.

Strong winds affected Antigua and Saint Kitts, with many ships in Saint Kitts washed ashore. At Grenada, nineteen Dutch ships were wrecked.

The hurricane later grounded 50 ships near Bermuda.

French islands

The hurricane produced a  storm surge on Martinique, destroying all houses in Saint-Pierre and causing 9,000 deaths. A storm surge also struck the south coast of Guadeloupe and caused considerable damage.

In Saint Vincent, the hurricane destroyed 584 of the 600 houses in Kingstown.

On Saint Lucia, rough waves and a strong storm tide struck the fleet of Admiral Rodney at Port Castries, with one ship destroying the city's hospital after being lifted on top of it. The hurricane destroyed all but two houses in Port Castries, and about 6,000 perished on the island.

High winds, heavy rains, and storm surge caused severe damage at Roseau in Dominica.

The attorney general of Guadeloupe writes:The gale of wind which happened on the 12th Oct. was the most severe perhaps ever known. Barbadoes suffered amazingly, 6500 souls perished. Tobago laid waste, Grenades, St. Vincent, St. Lucia, Martinique, suffered more than any person can conceive. St. Kitts and Eustatia, did not escape without damage: this island did but just feel it.

Dutch islands

A Dutch sea-officer was on a ship that was blown from Sint Eustatius to Martinique. When he returned to Sint Eustatius, he reported on the damage in Saint-Pierre, Martinique, Saint Vincent, and St. Lucia. He, the author writes in his letter:A short while ago it pleased the Lord Almighty to show us his power. Here we had from 12 to 22 October of this year a very fierce wind & a heavy see that ruined a lot of houses and warehouses, yes even many ships were wrecked and many people were killed. The wall has been completely washed away by the sea and the back of the house has been left only on single struts, yes it was so heavy that the sea flew over our house but we may thank the Lord for his mercy that we have come off so well.

He did not mention a dramatic death toll on the island. He also said that the situation there was not as bad as on the French and English islands.

Spanish islands

Heavy damage was reported in southern Puerto Rico, primarily in Cabo Rojo and Lajas. Severe damage also occurred in the eastern region of the Captaincy General of Santo Domingo.

Losses by the British Royal Navy

Among the ships lost from Rodney's fleet were the frigates HMS Phoenix, which was wrecked on the Cuban coast, and HMS Blanche, which disappeared without a trace. The sixth rate frigates HMS Andromeda and HMS Laurel were wrecked on Martinique with heavy loss of life. By far the worst losses in the British fleet, however, were under the command of Vice Admiral Peter Parker and Rear-Admiral Joshua Rowley. At the time of the hurricane, Rowley was off the coast of New York with a portion of the fleet, including HMS Sandwich, while Parker was in Port Royal, Jamaica. Many of their ships, however, were in the hurricane's path. HMS Thunderer, HMS Stirling Castle, HMS Scarborough, HMS Barbados, HMS Deal Castle, HMS Victor, and HMS Endeavour were lost, among others, and almost all of their crews died. Seven other ships were dismasted.

Losses by the French navy

A fleet of 40 French ships involved in the American Revolutionary War was struck off Martinique during the hurricane. Several hundred soldiers and about 9,000 civilians died; however, the French military's only loss was the frigate Junon.

Name 

The storm was named the San Calixto hurricane in Puerto Rico because the eye of the cyclone made landfall there on October 14, the Christian feast day of Pope Callixtus I, venerated by the Roman Catholic Church as Saint Callixtus ("San Calixto" in Spanish). Since European arrival in the Americas in 1492, all storms and hurricanes had been named after the name of the saint of the day the storm hit Puerto Rico; for example, the 1867 San Narciso hurricane, the 1899 San Ciriaco hurricane, the 1928 San Felipe hurricane, and the 1932 San Ciprian hurricane were named after the feast day on which they struck.

In 1953, the United States Weather Bureau (now the National Weather Service) started naming hurricanes by female human names until 1978, when both gender names began to be used after control over naming was relinquished to the World Meteorological Organization. However, it was only in 1960 that hurricanes stopped being officially named after saints in Puerto Rico; the only two cyclones to ever have both an official woman name and an informal saint name were Hurricane Betsy (Santa Clara, August 12, 1956) and Hurricane Donna (San Lorenzo, September 5, 1960).

See also

List of Bermuda hurricanes
List of deadliest Atlantic hurricanes
Lists of Atlantic hurricanes
Hurricane Irma – A powerful Category 5 hurricane that affected similar areas in 2017

Further reading
 Blodgett, L., Climatology of United States, p. 397, "The Great Hurricane of 1780."
 Depradine, C. A., 1989: Pre-1900 severe hurricanes in the Caribbean.  Notes compiled for the Caribbean Meteorological Institute, Saint James, Barbados.  
 Dunbar, 1804: Transactions of the American [Philosophical] Society, Philadelphia, vol. 6, second series. Philadelphia.
 Fitzpatrick, Patrick J., 1999: Natural Disasters: Hurricanes.  ABC-CLIO Inc., 
 Ludlum, D. M., 1963: Early American hurricanes, 1492–1870. Amer. Meteor. Soc., Boston, 198 pp.
 Millas, Dr. José Carlos, 1968: Hurricanes of the Caribbean and adjacent regions, 1492–1800. Academy of the Arts and Sciences of the Americas, Miami, Florida, 328 pp.  
 Salivia, Dr. Luis A., 1950: Historia de los Temporales de Puerto Rico, 1508–1949.  
 Winds and weather of the West Indian region, U.S. Weather Bureau, 1940, 190 pp.

References

1780 Great
1780 Great
1780 Great
1780 Great
1780 Great
1780 Great
1780 Great
1780 Great
Hurricanes in Martinique
1780 Great
1780 Great
1780 Great
1780 Great
1780 Great
Hurricanes in the United States Virgin Islands
Natural disasters in the Leeward Islands
Natural disasters in the Windward Islands
Great Hurricane of 1780
1780 in the Caribbean
1780 in the United States 
1780 disasters in the United States

History of British Saint Christopher and Nevis
18th century in Guadeloupe
18th century in Haiti